Trust Party may refer to:
Trust (British political party)
Trust (Greek political party)
Trust (parliamentary group)